The PC System Design Guide (also known as the PC-97, PC-98, PC-99, or PC 2001 specification) is a series of hardware design requirements and recommendations for IBM PC compatible personal computers, compiled by Microsoft and Intel Corporation during 1997–2001. They were aimed at helping manufacturers provide hardware that made the best use of the capabilities of the Microsoft Windows operating system, and to simplify setup and use of such computers.

Every part of a standard computer and the most common kinds of peripheral devices are defined with specific requirements. Systems and devices that meet the specification should be automatically recognized and configured by the operating system.

Versions

Four versions of the PC System Design Guide were released. In PC-97, a distinction was made between the requirements of a Basic PC, a Workstation PC and an Entertainment PC. In PC-98, the Mobile PC was added as a category. In PC 2001, the Entertainment PC was dropped.

PC-97
Required:
 120 MHz Pentium or MIPS R4x00 or Digital Alpha 21064 (EV4) or IBM PowerPC architecture (latter three only under Windows NT)
 16 MB RAM

Initial version.
 Introduced color code for PS/2 keyboard (purple) and PS/2 mouse (green) connectors

PC-98
Aimed at systems to be used with Windows 98 or Windows 2000. Required:
 200 MHz Pentium processor with MMX technology (or equivalent performance)
 256 KB L2 cache
 32 MB RAM (recommended: 64 MB of 66 MHz DRAM)
 ACPI 1.0 (including power button behavior)
 Fast BIOS power-up (limited RAM test, no floppy test, minimal startup display, etc.)
 BIOS Y2K compliance
 PXE preboot environment

PC-99
Required:
 300 MHz CPU
 64 MB RAM
 USB
 Comprehensive color-coding scheme for ports and connectors (see below)
Strongly discouraged:
 Non plug-and-play hardware
 ISA slots

PC 2001
Required:
 667 MHz CPU
 64 MB RAM

Final version. First to require IO-APICs to be enabled on all desktop systems. Places a greatly increased emphasis on legacy-reduced and legacy-free systems. Some "legacy" items such as ISA expansion slots and device dependence on MS-DOS are forbidden entirely, while others are merely strongly discouraged.

Color-coding scheme for connectors and ports 

 
Perhaps the most end-user visible and lasting impact of PC 99 was that it introduced a color code for the various standard types of plugs and connectors used on PCs. As many of the connectors look very similar, particularly to a novice PC user, this made it far easier for people to connect peripherals to the correct ports on a PC. This color code was gradually adopted by almost all PC and motherboard manufacturers. Some of the color codes have also been widely adopted by peripheral manufacturers.

See also
 ATX
 Legacy-free PC
 Multimedia PC
 Sound card
 PoweredUSB (proprietary high-power USB extension using other color-coded ports)

References

External links
Legacy PC Design Guides – Microsoft Download Center

PDF versions:
PC-97 System Design Guide
PC-98 System Design Guide 
PC-99 System Design Guide 
PC 2001 System Design Guide

Color codes
Computer standards
IBM PC compatibles